Rivoli Theatre is a municipal theatre in Oporto, Portugal.

History
In 1913 a new theatre called Teatro Nacional opened in Porto. Over the next several years, changes in the urban center led to modernization of the property, and in 1923 the new Rivoli Theatre appeared, remodelled, adapted to cinema and with programming of opera, dance, theater and music. The new theatre, in Art Deco style, was the responsibility of the Architect and Engineer Júlio Brito.

 Rivoli Theatre is a municipal theater, Teatro Municipal do Porto.

Art Deco architecture in Portugal
Theatres and concert halls in Porto
Concert halls in Portugal